Demirkazık Peak is a summit in Aladağlar a portion of Toros Mountains, Turkey. Being a conical mountain, it is a famous peak among the mountaineers. However, it may not be the highest point of the mountain range.

First successful climbing to the summit was by Georg Künne, Wilhelm Martin, his wife Marianne, Veli Çavuş and their guide Yunus in July 1927.

References

Mountains of Turkey
Landforms of Niğde Province
Çamardı District
Three-thousanders of Turkey